Lansburgh may refer to:

G. Albert Lansburgh (1876–1969), American architect, known for his work on luxury cinemas and theatres
Richard H. Lansburgh (1893–1942), American economist, management consultant, Professor of Industry at the University of Pennsylvania's Wharton School
Lansburgh Theatre in downtown Washington, D.C.
Lansburgh's, a chain of department stores in the Washington, D.C. area

See also
Flansburgh (surname)